Friday Harbor is a series of contemporary romance novels written by best-selling author Lisa Kleypas. The series focuses on the lives of the Nolan family and is set in the San Juan Islands off the coast of Washington.

Books
Christmas Eve at Friday Harbor (2010) 
Rainshadow Road (2012) 
Dream Lake (2012) 
Crystal Cove (2013)

TV Movie
Christmas with Holly, a TV-movie adaptation of Christmas Eve at Friday Harbor, aired on ABC in 2012.

References

Book series introduced in 2010
Novel series
American romance novels
Novels set in Washington (state)